Anthony Woodson (born January 7, 1988) is a professional Canadian football running back who is currently a free agent. He was drafted 29th overall by the Winnipeg Blue Bombers in the 2010 CFL Draft and played for parts of two seasons with the club. On September 9, 2013, Woodson was traded to the Toronto Argonauts, along with a fifth round draft pick in 2014, in exchange for offensive lineman Marc Parenteau and a third round draft pick in 2014. He signed with the Hamilton Tiger-Cats as a free agent on February 11, 2015 and spent two years with the team before signing with his hometown Stampeders on February 17, 2017.

Woodson played CIS football for the Calgary Dinos from 2006 to 2008 and 2010 to 2011, sitting out the 2009 season due to injury.

References

External links
Calgary Stampeders bio
Hamilton Tiger-Cats bio
Toronto Argonauts bio

1988 births
Living people
Calgary Dinos football players
Calgary Stampeders players
Canadian football running backs
Hamilton Tiger-Cats players
Players of Canadian football from Alberta
Canadian football people from Calgary
Toronto Argonauts players
Winnipeg Blue Bombers players